The Grand National is an English horse race.

Grand National may also refer to:

Sports
AMA Grand National Championship, a US motorcycle racing series
Grand National (greyhounds), an English greyhound race
Grand National (Irish greyhounds), an Irish greyhound race
Grand National Handicap, a horse race run at Jerome Park Racetrack, New York, from 1866 to 1889
Grand National Hurdle Stakes, an American horse race
Grand National Rodeo, run by the California Department of Food and Agriculture in the Cow Palace
Irish Grand National, an Irish horse race
Scottish Grand National, a Scottish horse race
The second name of NASCAR's Cup Series, which was known as the Grand National from 1950 to 1971
NASCAR's second-tier series known as the Xfinity Series was once called the Busch Grand National series
Welsh Grand National, a Welsh horse race

Entertainment
Grand National (album), a 2007 album by the John Butler Trio
Grand National (band), British dance band from London
Grand National, a 1983 computer game for ZX Spectrum published by CRL Group
Grand National (video game), a 1985 computer game for ZX Spectrum published by Elite
Grand National (roller coaster), a racing-themed roller coaster
Grand National Pictures, a film production company

Other
A special performance edition of the Buick Regal
Grand National Party, a political party in South Korea
Grand National Teams, American national bridge championship
Grand National Consolidated Trades Union

See also

 The National (disambiguation)
 National (disambiguation)
 Grand (disambiguation)